Immediately after World War II, New York City became known as one of the world's greatest cities. However, after peaking in population in 1950, the city began to feel the effects of suburbanization brought about by new housing communities such as Levittown, a downturn in industry and commerce as businesses left for places where it was cheaper and easier to operate, an increase in crime, and an upturn in its welfare burden, all of which reached a nadir in the city's fiscal crisis of the 1970s, when it barely avoided defaulting on its obligations and declaring bankruptcy.

Postwar: Late 1940s through 1950s
As many great cities lay in ruins after World War II, New York City assumed a new global prominence. It became the home of the United Nations headquarters, built 1947–1952; inherited the role from Paris as center of the art world with Abstract Expressionism; and became a rival to London in the international finance and art markets. Yet the population declined after 1950, with increasing suburbanization in the New York metropolitan area as pioneered in Levittown, New York.

Midtown Manhattan, fueled by postwar prosperity, was experiencing an unprecedented building boom that changed its very appearance. Glass-and-steel office towers in the new International Style began to replace the ziggurat-style towers (built in wedding-cake style) of the prewar era. Also rapidly changing was the eastern edge of the East Village close to FDR Drive. Many traditional apartment blocks were cleared and replaced with large-scale public housing projects. In Lower Manhattan, urban renewal began to take shape around 1960, led by David Rockefeller's construction of the One Chase Manhattan Plaza building.

In a built-out city, construction entails destruction. After the old Beaux Arts Pennsylvania Station was torn down, growing concern for preservation led to the 1965 Landmarks Preservation Commission Law. The city's other great train station, Grand Central, was also threatened with demolition but was eventually saved. Meanwhile, New York City's network of highways spread under the guidance of Robert Moses, with consequent increased traffic congestion, but the defeat in 1962 of Moses' planned Lower Manhattan Expressway by community activists led by Jane Jacobs was an indication that Moses would no longer have the free hand he had enjoyed in the past.

1960s

During the 1960s, a gradual economic and social decay set in. A symptom of the city's waning competitiveness was the loss of both its longtime resident National League baseball teams to booming California; the Dodgers and the Giants both moved after the 1957 season. A sports void was partially filled with the formation of the Mets in 1962, who played their first two seasons at the Polo Grounds, the former home of the Giants, before moving to Shea Stadium in Queens in 1964.

The passage of the federal Immigration Act of 1965, which abolished national-origin quotas, set the stage for increased immigration from Asia, which became the basis for New York's modern Asian American community.

On November 9, 1965, New York endured a widespread power blackout along with much of eastern North America. (The city's ordeal became the subject of the 1968 film, Where Were You When the Lights Went Out?) The postwar population shift to the suburbs resulted in the decline of textile manufacturing and other traditional industries in New York, most of which also operated in extremely outdated facilities. With the arrival of container shipping, that industry shifted to New Jersey where there was more room for it. Blue-collar neighborhoods began to deteriorate and become centers of drugs and crime. Strip clubs and other adult businesses started filling Times Square in the late 1960s.

In 1966, the US Navy decommissioned the Brooklyn Navy Yard, ending a command going back to the early 19th century. It was sold to the city. The Yard continued as a site for shipbuilding for another eleven years.

From November 23 to 26, 1966, New York City was covered by a major smog episode, filling the city's air with damaging levels of several toxic pollutants. The smog was caused by a combination of factors, including the use of coal-burning power plants, the heavy traffic on the city's roads, and the widespread use of wood-burning stoves and fireplaces. It was the third major smog in New York City, following events of similar scale in 1953 and 1963.

Mayor Lindsay
John Lindsay, a liberal Republican, was a highly visible and charismatic mayor from 1966 to 1973. The city was a national center of protest movements regarding civil rights for black citizens, opposition to the Vietnam War, and the newly emerging feminist and gay movements. There were jolting economic shocks as the postwar prosperity came to an end with many factories and entire industries shutting down. There was a population transition with hundreds of thousands of African-Americans and Puerto Ricans moving in, and an exodus of European-Americans to the suburbs. Labor unions, especially in teaching, transit, sanitation and construction, fractured over major strikes and internal racial tensions.

Strikes and riots
The Transport Workers Union of America (TWU) led by Mike Quill shut down the city with a complete halt of subway and bus service on mayor John Lindsay's first day of office. As New Yorkers endured the transit strike, Lindsay remarked, "I still think it's a fun city," and walked four miles (6 km) from his hotel room to City Hall in a gesture to show it. Dick Schaap, then a columnist for the New York Herald Tribune, coined and popularized the sarcastic term in an article titled Fun City. In the article, Schaap sardonically pointed out that it was not.

The transit strike was the first of many labor struggles. In 1968 the teachers' union (the United Federation of Teachers, or the UFT) went on strike over the firings of several teachers in a school in Ocean Hill and Brownsville.

That same year, 1968, also saw a nine-day sanitation strike. Quality of life in New York reached a nadir during this strike, as mounds of garbage caught fire, and strong winds whirled the filth through the streets. With the schools shut down, the police engaged in a slowdown, firefighters threatening job actions, the city awash in garbage, and racial and religious tensions breaking to the surface, Lindsay later called the last six months of 1968 "the worst of my public life."

The Stonewall riots were a series of spontaneous, violent demonstrations against a police raid that took place in the early morning hours of June 28, 1969, at the Stonewall Inn, in the Greenwich Village neighborhood of New York City. They are frequently cited as the first instance in American history when people in the homosexual community fought back against a government-sponsored system that persecuted sexual minorities, and they have become the defining event that marked the start of the gay rights movement in the United States and around the world.

1970s

By 1970, the city gained notoriety for high rates of crime and other social disorders. A popular song by Cashman & West in the autumn of 1972, "American City Suite", chronicled, in allegorical fashion, the decline in the city's quality of life. The city's subway system was regarded as unsafe due to crime and suffered frequent mechanical breakdowns. Prostitutes and pimps frequented Times Square, while Central Park became feared as the site of muggings and rapes. Homeless persons and drug dealers occupied boarded-up and abandoned buildings. The New York City Police Department was subject to investigation for widespread corruption, most famously in the 1971 testimony of whistle-blowing police officer Frank Serpico. In June 1975 a coalition of labor unions distributed a pamphlet to arriving visitors, warning them to stay away.

The opening of the mammoth World Trade Center complex in 1972, however, was one of the few high points of the city's history at that time. Conceived by David Rockefeller and built by the Port Authority of New York and New Jersey on the site of the Radio Row electronics district in Lower Manhattan, the Twin Towers displaced the Empire State Building in Midtown as the world's tallest building; it was displaced in turn by Chicago's Sears Tower in 1973.

Fiscal crisis

US economic stagnation in the 1970s hit New York City particularly hard, amplified by a large movement of middle-class residents to the suburbs, which drained the city of tax revenue. In February 1975, New York City entered a serious fiscal crisis. Under mayor Abraham Beame, the city had run out of money to pay for normal operating expenses, was unable to borrow more, and faced the prospect of defaulting on its obligations and declaring bankruptcy. The city admitted an operating deficit of at least $600 million, though the actual total city debt was more than $11 billion and the city was unable to borrow money from the credit markets. There were numerous reasons for the crisis, including overly optimistic forecasts of revenues, underfunding of pensions, use of capital allocations and reserves for operating costs, and poor budgetary and accounting practices. Another perspective given on this matter is that as the most capitalised city of the United States at that time, New York hosted an array of welfare and benefits for its people, including nineteen public hospitals, mass transit facilities and most importantly, New York City provided higher education for free with the Municipal University system. The city government was reluctant to confront municipal labor unions; an announced "hiring freeze" was followed by an increase in city payrolls of 13,000 people in one quarter, and an announced layoff of eight thousand workers resulted in only 436 employees leaving the city government.

The first solution proposed was the Municipal Assistance Corporation, which tried to pool the city's money and refinance its heavy debts. It was established on June 10, 1975, with Felix Rohatyn as chairman, and a board of nine prominent citizens, eight of whom were bankers. In the meanwhile, the crisis continued to worsen, with the admitted city deficit reaching $750 million; municipal bonds could be sold only at a significant loss to the underwriters.

The MAC insisted that the city make major reforms, including a wage freeze, a major layoff, a subway fare hike, and charging tuition at the City University of New York. The New York State Legislature supported the MAC by passing a law converting the city sales tax and stock transfer tax into state taxes, which when collected were then used as security for the MAC bonds. The State of New York also passed a state law that created an Emergency Financial Control Board to monitor the city's finances, required the city to balance its budget within three years, and required the city to follow accepted accounting practices. But even with all of these measures, the value of the MAC bonds dropped in price, and the city struggled to find the money to pay its employees and stay in operation. The MAC sold off $10 billion in bonds.

It failed to achieve results quickly and the state came up with a much more drastic solution: the Emergency Financial Control Board (EFCB). It was a state agency, and city officials had only two votes on the seven-member board. The EFCB took full control of the city's budget. It made drastic cuts in municipal services and spending, cut city employment, froze salaries and raised bus and subway fares. The level of welfare spending was cut. Some hospitals were closed as were some branch libraries and fire stations. The labor unions helped out, by allocating much of their pension funds to the purchase of city bonds—putting the pensions at risk if bankruptcy took place.

A statement by Mayor Beame was drafted and ready to be released on October 17, 1975, if the teachers' union did not invest $150 million from its pension funds in city securities. "I have been advised by the comptroller that the City of New York has insufficient cash on hand to meet debt obligations due today," the statement said. "This constitutes the default that we have struggled to avoid." The Beame statement was never distributed because Albert Shanker, the teachers' union president, finally furnished $150 million from the union's pension fund to buy Municipal Assistance Corporation bonds. Two weeks later, President Gerald R. Ford angered New Yorkers by refusing to grant the city a bailout. 

Ford later signed the New York City Seasonal Financing Act of 1975, a congressional bill that extended $2.3 billion worth of federal loans to the city for three years. In return, Congress ordered the city to increase charges for city services, to cancel a wage increase for city employees and to drastically reduce the number of people in its workforce.  

Rohatyn and the MAC directors persuaded the banks to defer the maturity of the bonds they held and to accept less interest. They also persuaded the city and state employee pension funds to buy MAC bonds to pay off the city's debts. The city government cut the number of its employees by 40,000, deferred the wage increases already agreed to in contracts and kept them below the level of inflation. The loans were repaid with interest.A fiscal conservative, Democrat Ed Koch, was elected as mayor in 1977. By 1977–78, New York City had eliminated its short-term debt. By 1985, the City no longer needed the support of the Municipal Assistance Corporation, and it voted itself out of existence.

Blackout
The New York City blackout of 1977 struck on July 13 of that year and lasted for 25 hours, during which black and Hispanic neighborhoods fell prey to destruction and looting. Over 3,000 people were arrested, and the city's already crowded prisons were so overburdened that some suggested reopening the recently condemned Manhattan Detention Complex.

The financial crisis, high crime rates, and damage from the blackouts led to a widespread belief that New York City was in irreversible decline and beyond redemption. By the end of the 1970s, nearly a million people had left, a population loss that would not be recouped for another twenty years. To Jonathan Mahler, the chronicler of The Bronx is Burning, "The clinical term for it, fiscal crisis, didn't approach the raw reality. Spiritual crisis was more like it."

See also 
 American urban history
 Timeline of New York City, 1950s–1970s
 1949 New York City mayoral election
 1953 New York City mayoral election
 1957 New York City mayoral election
 1961 New York City mayoral election
 1965 New York City mayoral election
 1969 New York City mayoral election
 1973 New York City mayoral election
 1977 New York City mayoral election

References

Bibliography

 Brecher, Charles, et al. Power Failure: New York City Politics and Policy since 1960 (Oxford University Press, 1993) 420 pages; online edition
 Burns, Ric, and James Sanders. New York: An Illustrated History (2003), large-scale book version of Burns PBS documentary, New York: A Documentary Film an eight part, 17½ hour documentary film directed by Ric Burns for PBS. It originally aired in 1999 with additional episodes airing in 2001 and 2003.
 Cannato, Vincent J. The ungovernable city: John Lindsay and his struggle to save New York (2001)
 Colgrove, James. "Reform and its discontents: public health in New York City during the Great Society." Journal of policy history (2007) 19#1 pp: 3-28. online
 Flanagan, Richard M. Robert Wagner and the Rise of New York City's Plebiscitary Mayoralty: The Tamer of the Tammany Tiger (Palgrave Macmillan, 2014)
 Freeman, Joshua B. Working-class New York: life and labor since World War II (2001)
 Gratz, Roberta Brandes. The Battle for Gotham: New York in the Shadow of Robert Moses and Jane Jacobs (Nation Books, 2011)
 Haslip-Viera, Gabriel. Boricuas In Gothamed: Puerto Ricans In The Making Of New York City (2004)
 Jackson, Kenneth T., ed. The Encyclopedia of New York City (Yale University Press, 1995)  1350 pages; articles by experts; 2nd expanded edition 2010, 1585pp
 Jacobs, James B., Coleen Friel, and Robert Raddick. Gotham unbound: How New York city was liberated from the grip of organized crime (NYU Press, 2001)
 Korrol, Virginia Sanchez and Pedro Juan Hernandez. Pioneros II: Puerto Ricans in New York City, 1948-1998 (2010), 127pp
 Levinson, Marc. "Container Shipping and the Decline of New York, 1955–1975." Business History Review (2006) 80#1 pp: 49–80.
 Lagumina, Salvator.  New York at Mid-Century: The Impellitteri Years (1992), He was Mayor in 1950-53
 Mahler, Jonathan.  The Bronx is Burning: 1977, Baseball, Politics, and the Battle for the Soul of a City (2006)
 Mollenkopf, John, ed. Power, Culture, and Place (Russell Sage Foundation, 1988)
 Morris, Charles R. The cost of good intentions: New York City and the liberal experiment, 1960-1975 (1981).
 Orlebeke, Charles J.  "Saving New York: The Ford Administration and the New York City Fiscal Crisis," in Alexej Ugrinsky and Bernard J. Firestone eds. Gerald R. Ford and the Politics of Post-Watergate America - Vol. 2 (1993)  pp 359–85 With commentary by  Abraham D. Beame, Hugh L. Carey, et al. pp 386–414 online
 Plunz, Richard. A history of housing in New York City (Columbia UP, 2018).

 Podair, Jerald E. The Strike That Changed New York: Blacks, Whites, and the Ocean Hill-Brownsville Crisis (Yale University Press, 2008)
 Roberts, Sam, ed. America's Mayor: John V. Lindsay and the Reinvention of New York (2010) Essays on multiple topics, well illustrated
 Samuel, Lawrence R. New York City 1964: A Cultural History (McFarland, 2014)
 Sayre, Wallace S. and Herbert Kaufman, Governing New York City: Politics in the Metropolis (1965) 782pp
 Shefter, Martin. Political crisis/fiscal crisis: The collapse and revival of New York City (Columbia University Press, 1992)
 Taylor, Clarence, ed. Civil Rights in New York City: From World War II to the Giuliani Era (Oxford University Press, 2011)
 Thomas, Lorrin. Puerto Rican citizen: history and political identity in twentieth-century New York City (University of Chicago Press, 2010)
 Tochterman, Brian L. The Dying City: Postwar New York and the Ideology of Fear (2017), Covers late 1940s to the 1980s
 Viteritti, Joseph P. Summer in the City: John Lindsay, New York, and the American Dream (2014) Essays by scholars evaluate politics, race relations, finance, public management, architecture, economic development, and the arts.
 Wollman, Elizabeth L. Hard Times: The Adult Musical in 1970s New York City (Oxford University Press, 2013)

External links
 "What Does It Take To Get A Decent Apartment In The Big Apartment Squeeze?", New York Magazine, September 30, 1968 issue.

Chronology

06
20th century in New York City